The Roland Robinson Literary Award was created in memory of the Australian poet, Roland Robinson, who died in 1992. It was awarded from 1993 to 2008.

The prize was run by the City of Lake Macquarie and was awarded to both poetry and short stories in alternating years. It had a first prize of A$500.

Winners 
 1993: Marion Steed Appearances
 1994: Marion Steed The Codependent’s Revenge
 1995: Jean Kent, A Meaningful Life
 1996: Richard Kelly Tipping
 1997: Pam Jeffery, James Dean and Old Dreams
 1998: David Kirkby, Junga Jimi 
 1999: David Kirkby, Waves
 2000: Judy Johnson, Bell and Norman Talbot, Asks the Storyteller
 2001: Josh Davis, Chaos Theory
 2002: Jan Iwaszkiewicz, Letter from Lone Pine
 2003: Julie Simpson, Bella is Knitting Iced Vo Vos 
 2004: Christopher Brown Escarpment
 2005: Wendy Alexander, Fifth Branch Down
 2006: Andrew Slattery, The Westerly
 2007: Ryan O'Neil, A Speeding Bullet
 2008: Kylie Rose, Bluebottles

Notes

References
 The Roland Robinson Literary Awards

Awards established in 1992
Australian poetry awards
2008 disestablishments in Australia